Following is a list of Kalaripayattu practitioners.

Legendary figures
 Agastya, a Hindu sage, and one of the Saptarishi of Hinduism, is credited with influencing the southern style of Kalaripayattu, or Thekkan Kalari as per myth.
 Ayyappan, prince of Pandalam dynasty and the deity of Sabarimala.
 Parashurama, an avatar of the Hindu deity Vishnu, generally regarded as the founder of Kalaripayattu, especially the northern style or Vadakkan Kalari, as per myth.

12th century – 19th century
 Arattupuzha Velayudha Panicker
 Aromal Chekavar
 Chandu Chekavar
 Giacomo Fenicio, an Italian Christian priest of Arthunkal.
 Kadhirur Gurukkal
 Kayamkulam Kochunni, an outlaw known for helping the poor.
 Keeleri Kunhikannan, a gymnast and martial artist.
 Thacholi Othenan
 Thevar vellan, the warrior Thacholi othenan could not defeat because of martial art skills
 Unniyarcha

20th century – present
 Adah Sharma, Indian actress.
 Aditi Rao Hydari, Bollywood actress.
 Akhila Sasidharan, Malayalam actress.
 Asin, Indian actress.
 C. Gangadharan, martial artist, PhD holder in Kalaripayattu.
 Dia Mirza, Bollywood actress.
 Jacqueline Fernandez, Bollywood actress.
 Jasmine Simhalan, martial artist and classical dancer.
 Lissy, Malayalam actress.
 Meenakshi Amma, a Kalaripayattu teacher and Padma Sri recipient.
 Parineeti Chopra, Bollywood actress.
 Phillip B. Zarrilli, a theatre actor, acting coach and academician, first PhD holder in Kalaripayattu.
 Ranbir Kapoor, Bollywood actor.
 Sankara Narayana Menon Chundayil, Kalaripayattu teacher and Padma Sri recipient
 Sanya Malhotra, Bollywood actress.
 Simhalan Madhava Panicker, martial artist and actor.
 Tiger Shroff, Bollywood actor.
 Vasundhara Doraswamy, a classical dancer and teacher.
 Vidyut Jammwal, a Bollywood actor and Kalaripayattu endorser.

References

Kalarippayattu
Indian martial arts
Dravidian martial arts
Culture of Kerala